Gyulyovtsa is a village in South- East Bulgaria, situated in Obshtina Nessebar, in the Burgas region.

Villages in Burgas Province